Ahmed Eid may refer to:
 Ahmed Eid (swimmer)
 Ahmed Eid (footballer)